Martin Sharp (26 June 1917 – 24 February 1991) was a British sailor. He competed in the 6 Metre event at the 1952 Summer Olympics.

References

External links
 

1917 births
1991 deaths
British male sailors (sport)
Olympic sailors of Great Britain
Sailors at the 1952 Summer Olympics – 6 Metre
Sportspeople from London